Morton Community Unit School District 709 a unit school district in Morton, Illinois.  It has six schools:
Jefferson Elementary School (K-6)
Lincoln Elementary School (K-6)
Lettie Brown Elementary School (K-6)
Grundy Elementary School (K-6) 
Morton Junior High School (7-8)
Morton High School (9-12)

External links
 District website

School districts in Illinois
Education in Tazewell County, Illinois